Cérons (Gascon: Seron or Serons) is a commune in the Gironde department in Nouvelle-Aquitaine in southwestern France. Cérons station has rail connections to Agen, Langon and Bordeaux.

Population

See also
Communes of the Gironde department

References

Communes of Gironde